Treherne Airport  is located  east of Treherne, Manitoba, Canada.

See also
Treherne (South Norfolk Airpark) Aerodrome

References

Registered aerodromes in Manitoba